The WTA Tour is the elite tour for professional women's tennis organised by the Women's Tennis Association (WTA). The WTA Tour includes the four Grand Slam tournaments, the WTA Tour Championships and the WTA Tier I, Tier II, Tier III and Tier IV events. ITF tournaments are not part of the WTA Tour, although they award points for the WTA World Ranking.

Schedule 
This is the complete schedule of events on the 1998 WTA Tour, with player progression documented from the quarter-final stage.

Key

January

February

March

April

May

June

July

August

September

October

November

Statistical information 

List of players and titles won, last name alphabetically:
  Lindsay Davenport – Tokyo (Tier I), Stanford, San Diego, Los Angeles, US Open, Zurich (6)
  Martina Hingis – Australian Open, Indian Wells, Hamburg, Rome, WTA Championships (5)
  Patty Schnyder – Hobart, Hanover, Madrid, Maria Lankowitz, Palermo (5)
  Jana Novotná – Linz, Eastbourne, Wimbledon, Prague (4)
  Mary Pierce – Paris, Amelia Island, Moscow, Luxembourg (4)
  Steffi Graf – New Haven, Leipzig, Philadelphia (3)
  Venus Williams – Oklahoma City, Miami and Grand Slam Cup (3)
  Julie Halard-Decugis – 's-Hertogenbosch and Pattaya City (2)
  Conchita Martínez – Berlin, Warsaw (2)
  Henrieta Nagyová – Sopot, Istanbul (2)
  Arantxa Sánchez Vicario – Sydney, French Open (2)
  Monica Seles – Montreal, Tokyo (Tier II) (2)
  Ai Sugiyama – Gold Coast, Tokyo (Tier III) (2)
  Amanda Coetzer – Hilton Head (1)
  Mariaan de Swardt – Boston (1)
  Květa Hrdličková – Makarska (1)
  Mirjana Lučić – Bol (1)
  Virginia Ruano Pascual – Budapest (1)
  Tara Snyder – Quebec City (1)
  Irina Spîrlea – Strasbourg (1)
  Paola Suárez – Bogotá (1)
  Sandrine Testud – Filderstadt (1)
  Dominique Van Roost – Auckland (1)

The following players won their first title:
  Patty Schnyder
  Paola Suárez
  Venus Williams
  Květa Hrdličková
  Mariaan de Swardt
  Tara Snyder

List of titles won by country:
  – 12 – Tokyo (Tier I), Oklahoma City, Miami, Stanford, San Diego, Los Angeles, Montreal, US Open, Tokyo (Tier II), Grand Slam Cup, Zurich, Quebec City
  – 10 – Hobart, Australian Open, Hanover, Indian Wells, Hamburg, Rome, Madrid, Maria Lankowitz, Palermo, WTA Championships
  – 7 – Paris, Amelia Island, 's-Hertogenbosch, Filderstadt, Moscow, Luxembourg, Pattaya City
  – 5 – Linz, Makarska, Eastbourne, Wimbledon, Prague
  – 5 – Sydney, Budapest, Berlin, French Open, Warsaw
  – 3 – New Haven, Leipzig, Philadelphia
  – 2 – Gold Coast, Tokyo (Tier III)
  – 2 – Hilton Head, Boston
  – 1 – Sopot, Istanbul
  – 1 – Bogotá
  – 1 – Auckland
  – 1 – Bol
  – 1 – Strasbourg

Rankings 
Below are the 1998 WTA year-end rankings in both singles and doubles competition:

See also 
 1998 ATP Tour

References 

 
WTA Tour
1998 WTA Tour